The Malindi Museum is a museum located in Malindi, Kenya. The museum is dedicated to the history of the ethnic groups of the Kenyan coast as well as the marine animals that inhabit it.

History 
The museum is located in the two story building dating from 1891 also known as House of Columns. The building was constructed by Adulhussein Gulamhussein. The Bohra community sold the building for 2,000 English pounds. The building operated as an Indian trading center since its establishment in 1891. The building that houses the museum was used as Malindi's first native hospital. On the east facade there is a colonnade featuring five round pillars. The building served as a hospital and headquarters of the Department of Fisheries. In 1991, it was declared a national monument. In 1999 the House of Columns was transferred to the National Museum of Kenya and a restoration opened in 2004 as museum.

The Malindi District Commissioner building has housed the Ethnographic Museum of coastal Kenya since 2009.

Collections 

The museum contains various historical artifacts from Malindi. The museum has exhibits containing traditional objects such as musical instruments, tools and costumes. On the ethnographic section, the museum contains various artifacts of the Mijikenda peoples who are ethnic groups inhabiting the Kenyan coast, including wooden totems, as well as ancient artifacts that belonged to Arabs who settled in Malindi. In addition, the museum features artifacts from other communities that inhabit the Kenyan coast, as well as objects from the Swahili civilization. The museum features exhibits about fish species and the history of Malindi. The museum features temporary exhibits including famous Malindi Coelacanth. The museum also contains artifacts related to the explorer Vasco da Gama. The museum also has exhibits from the Portuguese period of Kenya's coastal zone, as well as photographs of some of the country's archeological sites. In addition, the museum owns the Webb Memorial Library which has books on the history and culture of the Kenyan coast.

See also 
 List of museums in Kenya

References 

Museums in Kenya
Malindi